The Type 56 (literally; "Assault Rifle, Model of 1956")  is a Chinese 7.62×39mm rifle. It is a variant of the Soviet-designed AK-47 (specifically Type 3) and AKM rifles. The Type 56 rifle was designated by the Chinese military as "Type 1956 Sub-Machinegun", because the Type 56 took the role of SMG rather than infantry service rifle in the PLA in the rifle's early service years. Production started in 1956 at State Factory 66 but was eventually handed over to Norinco and PolyTech, who continue to manufacture the rifle primarily for export.

Service history
During the Cold War period, the Type-56 was exported to many countries and guerrilla forces throughout the world. Many of these rifles found their way to battlefields in Africa, Southeast Asia, and the Middle East and were used alongside other Kalashnikov pattern weapons from both the Soviet Union as well as the Warsaw Pact nations of Eastern Europe.

Chinese support for the Democratic Republic of Vietnam before the mid-1960s meant that the Type-56 was frequently encountered by American soldiers in the hands of either Vietcong guerrillas or PAVN soldiers during the Vietnam war. The Type-56 was discovered far more often than the original Russian-made AK-47s or AKMs.

When relations between China and North Vietnam crumbled in the 1970s and the Sino-Vietnamese War began, the Vietnamese government still possessed vast quantities of Type-56 rifles in its inventory. The People's Liberation Army still used the Type 56 as its standard weapon during this time as well. Thus, Chinese and Vietnamese forces fought each other using the same rifle.

The Type 56 was used extensively by Iranian forces during the Iran–Iraq War of the 1980s, with Iran purchasing large quantities of weapons from China for its armed forces. During the war, Iraq also purchased a small quantity, despite them being a major recipient of Soviet weapons and assistance during the conflict. This was done in conjunction with their purchasing of a large number of AKMs from Eastern Europe. Consequently, the Iran–Iraq War became another conflict in which both sides utilized the Type 56.

Since the end of the Cold War, the Type-56 has been used in many conflicts by various military forces. During the Croatian War of Independence and the Yugoslav Wars, it was used by the armed forces of Croatia. During the late 1990s, the Kosovo Liberation Army in Kosovo were also major users of the Type 56, with the vast majority of the weapons originating from People's Socialist Republic of Albania, which received Chinese support during much of the Cold War.

In the United Kingdom and United States, the Type-56 and its derivatives are frequently used in the filming of movies and television shows, standing in for Russian-made AK-47s due to their rarity among Kalashnikov style weapons. Type-56s are oftentimes visually modified to resemble other AK variants. In addition, versions of the Type-56 that have had their select fire ability removed (referred to as "sporter" rifles) are also available for civilian ownership in most parts of the United States.

In the mid-1980s, Sri Lanka began to replace their British L1A1 Self-Loading Rifle (SLR) and German HK G3s with the Type 56-2. Currently, the side-folding stock variant (Type 56-2) issued as the standard primary firearm.

The Type 81, Type 95 and Type 03 replaced the Type 56 in PLA front line service, but the Type 56 remains in use with reserve and militia units. Type 56s are still in production by Norinco for export customers.

During the Soviet–Afghan War in the 1980s, many Chinese Type 56 rifles were supplied to Afghan Mujahideen guerrillas to fight Soviet forces. The rifles were supplied by China, Pakistan and the US who obtained them from third party arms dealers. There is photographic evidence from Soviet/Russian sources where captured Chinese Type 56 rifles were utilized by Soviet Army soldiers in Afghanistan in lieu with their standard-issue Soviet AKM and AK-74 rifles.

Use of the Type 56 in Afghanistan also continued well into the early 21st century as the standard rifle of the Taliban such as when Taliban forces seized control of Kabul in 1996 (a majority of the Chinese small arms used by the Taliban were provided by Pakistan).

Since the overthrow of the Taliban by U.S.-led Coalition forces in late 2001, the Type-56 assault rifle has been utilized by the Afghan National Army, serving alongside many other AK-47 and AKM variant rifles.

The Type-56 has been regularly seen in the hands of militants from the Izz ad-Din al-Qassam Brigades, the armed wing of Hamas in the Palestinian territories.

The Type-56 has been used by the Janjaweed in the Darfur region of Sudan with pictures and news footage showing members of the Janjaweed carrying the rifles (most of them provided by the Sudanese government).

In 1987, Michael Ryan used a legally owned Type-56 rifle, and two other firearms, in the Hungerford massacre in the United Kingdom, in which he shot 32 people, 17 of whom died. The attack led to the passage of Firearms (Amendment) Act 1988, which bans ownership of semi-automatic centre-fire rifles and restricts the use of shotguns.

In the United States, a Type-56 rifle, purchased in Oregon under a false name, was used in the 1989 Stockton schoolyard shooting in which Patrick Purdy fired over 100 rounds to shoot one teacher and 34 children, killing five. The shooting led to the passage of California's Roberti-Roos Assault Weapons Control Act of 1989. A Type 56, along with a Type 56 S-1, were used by Larry Phillips, Jr. and Emil Mătăsăreanu during the 1997 North Hollywood shootout.

In the ongoing Syrian Civil War,  Type-56 assault rifles are typically seen in the hands of Free Syrian Army forces.

Compared to AK-47 and AKM

Originally, the Type-56 was a direct copy of the AK-47's final iteration, the Type 3 AK-47, and featured a milled receiver,  Starting in the mid-1960s, the guns were manufactured with stamped receivers much like the Soviet AKM. Visually, most versions of the Type 56 are distinguished from the AK-47 and AKM by the fully enclosed hooded front sight (all other AK pattern rifles, including those made in Russia, have a partially open front sight). Many versions also feature a folding bayonet attached to the barrel just aft of the muzzle. There are three different types of bayonets made for Type 56 rifles. The first Type-56s were near-identical copies of the Soviet milled AK-47. There is some speculation that the Chinese had to reverse engineer a copy of the AKM with the stamped receiver as they were not given a licence to produce the AKM and RPK by the Soviets because of failing relations after the Sino-Soviet split.

The Type 56 has a 1.6mm stamped receiver (like the RPK, although it lacks the reinforced trunnion of the RPK) versus the 1mm stamping of the AKM. Also uses a different riveting pattern that is similar to the RPK. Certain versions of the 56S/MAK-90 have a milled receiver.
The barrel on the Type 56 is similar to the AK-47 and heavier than that of the AKM though is pinned in like the AKM and unlike the AK-47. Military issued versions of the Type-56 also lack the threaded muzzle found on the AK-47 and AKM, this means they cannot use an AKM compensator or blank-firing device. Commercial versions of the Type 56 may or may not have a threaded muzzle.
The front sights are fully enclosed with a hood, compared to the AKM and AK-47 which have partially opened "ears". The front sight base has a shape similar to the AK-47 and may also have a SKS style folding spike bayonet (nicknamed the "pig sticker") as opposed to the lug for detachable knife bayonets on the AK-47 and AKM. There are three different types of spike bayonets made for the Type-56 and the Type-56 assault rifle is the only AK variant that utilizes a spike bayonet. Certain versions of the Type 56-II support standard AK-47 and AKM bayonets.
Has the double hook disconnector of the AK-47 rather than the single hook disconnector of the AKM. As a result it also lacks the hammer release delay device of the AKM, otherwise known as the rate reducer. The lack of hammer retarder is perhaps due to a preference of a slightly higher rate of fire, and simplicity. And did not have anything to do with thickness of the receiver, as the RPK included the hammer retarder also.
Has "in the white" bolt carrier, while the AKM bolt carrier is blued. Also lacks the various lightening cuts, though has a flat firing pin. Many civilian/export versions have a firing pin spring to prevent possible slamfires when used with softer commercial primers as opposed to the original free floating type. Some were added by importers rather than being a factory equipped part.
Has the flat/smooth handguards of the AK-47, with a storage slit underneath on versions equipped with the spike bayonet. Uniquely, it lacks vent cuts on the upper gas tube heatguard. Also retains a metal ferrule that sits between the lower handguard and the front of the receiver that the AK-47 had.
The pistol grip is the same kind as the AK-47 being made out of wood with a metal ferrule between it and the receiver instead of the later one piece bakelite like the AKM. The Type 56-II uses the AKM style with slightly different shape.
The trigger guard is held in place with only three rivets (one on each side and one beneath the pistol grip) where as the AK-47 and AKM have five (two on each side and one beneath the pistol grip).
Has a smooth dust cover like the AK-47 and unlike the ribbed dust cover of the AKM. However, it utilizes the simpler dual "U"-shaped recoil spring guide of the AKM instead of the telescoping rod of the AK-47.
Has a blued finish like the AK-47 and unlike the AKM, which has a black oxide finish or a parkerized finish.
Like the AK-47, sights will only adjust to 800 metres, whereas AKM sights adjust to 1000 metres. It also retains the button on the right side.
Nearly all Type 56's lack the side mount plate that was featured on many variations of the AK-47 and AKM.
The gas relief ports are located on the gas tube like the AK-47, unlike the AKM which had the gas relief ports relocated forward to the gas block. The gas block is also like the AK-47 in that it has the forward sling loop (instead of the handguard) and a cleaning rod capture.
The fixed stock of a Type 56 has a less in-line stock like the AK-47, opposed to the AKM which has a straighter stock. It, however, uses the AKM style single upper tang insert type attachment method and has the rear sling mount on the underside of the stock as opposed to the AK-47 dual tang type and receiver side sling mount. Its rear trunnion is also very similar to the AKM, though the distance between the rivets are different. Certain versions of the 56S/MAK-90 have an angled receiver back wall, though these are typically milled variants with a thumb hole stock.
The underfolders have stamped stocks like the AKMS but only lock on the left and are angled downwards like the AKS-47. The stocks are also typically made out of thicker steel, thus have less reinforcing ribs and detents, and they also lack the pistol grip reinforcement plate and true rear trunnion of the AKMS, having a simple pseudo end-cap rear trunnion, likely due to the thicker receiver.

Variants

Type 56 – Basic variant introduced in 1956. A copy of the AK-47 with a fixed wooden stock and permanently attached spike bayonet. In the mid-1960s production switched from machined to stamped receivers, mimicking the improved (and cheaper) Russian AKM, while the permanently attached bayonet became optional. Still used by Chinese reserve and militia units.
Type 56-I – Copy of the AKS, with an under-folding steel shoulder stock and the bayonet removed to make the weapon easier to carry. As with the original Type 56, milled receivers were replaced by stamped receivers in the mid-1960s, making the Type 56-1 an equivalent to the Russian AKMS. Civilian semi-auto versions (Type 56S-I) may have the spike bayonet added, though it is worth noting that this is not original military configuration.
Type 56-II – Improved variant introduced in 1980, with a side-folding stock and dark orange bakelite furniture. The bakelite on the stock also houses a cleaning kit, which both underfolding AKs (all nations) and other sidefolding AKs lacked instead requiring a separate pouch. It also allows a traditional detachable bayonet, both AK-47 and AKM styles, as an option in addition to the folding spike style. Mainly manufactured for export and rare in China as the Type 81 was already in production by the time of conception.
7.62 RK 56 TP – Modified Type 56-II in China for Finnish use, this is just an Type 56-II with a new hammer spring that allows for firing of Finnish 7.62x39.
Type 56-3 & Type 56-4 – Versions of the Type 56 and Type 56-I with Type 56-II synthetic furniture and optional detachable bayonets.
Type 56C (QBZ-56C) – Short-barrel version, introduced in 1991 for the domestic and export market. The QBZ-56C as it is officially designated in China, is a carbine variant of the Type 56-II and supplied in limited quantities to some PLA units. The Chinese Navy is now the most prominent user. Development began in 1988, after it was discovered that the Type 81 assault rifle was too difficult to shorten. In order to further reduce weight the bayonet lug was removed. The QBZ-56C is often carried with a twenty-round box magazine, although it is capable of accepting a standard Type 56 thirty-round magazine. It also has a sidefolding stock in addition to a muzzle booster, giving it a similar appearance to the AKS-74U.
 Type 56S or Type 56 Sporter, also known as the AK47S, AKS-762 and MAK-90 (Model of the AK)-1990 – civilian version with only semiautomatic mode. Later versions were modified to meet the requirements of a 1989 Executive Order by President George H. W. Bush prohibiting importation of certain 'assault rifle' configurations of military-style semi-automatic rifles such as the Norinco AKM/AK-47. These modifications included a one-piece U.S.-made thumbhole stock to replace the separate Chinese-made buttstock and pistol grip of the original AK rifle and the inclusion of a rivet on the receiver preventing use of standard AK-47, RPK, or AKM magazines.
 56S Galil sidefolder – A special version of the 56S/MAC-90 with an IMI Galil style side folding stock. Was exclusive to the US market.
 The Legend – Another version of the 56S/MAK-90 except configured to look like the Type 3 AK-47. It is extremely faithful to the Type 3 design, even having a milled receiver and original AK-47 style bayonet lug, but does retain some manufacturing differences from the Type 56 such as the pinned in barrel, lack of vent cuts on the gas tube heat guard, only 3 rivets on the trigger guard, the stamped recoil guide rod, spring loaded firing pin and variance in machining such as on the receiver and lightening cuts. Like the previous, US market only.
 Type 56M or Type 56-5 – RPK style LMG version of the Type 56. Utilizes a standard Type 56 stamped receiver and front trunnion, likely due to their rigidity, and its bi-pod is more RPD like then RPK, being tubular. It seems to have two configurations with only minor cosmetic changes, one with standard AK-47/M open sights with "ears" and the bi-pod directly behind the front sight base, and a second configuration with typical Type 56 enclosed "hooded" sights and the bi-pod in front of the front sight base near the muzzle. The latter version usually is seen with a birdcage flash hider or AK-74 style muzzle brake. Like the Type 56-II, it was only made for export as the Type 81 LMG was selected for military service instead. Civilian semi-auto sporter versions are known as the Type 87S (Type 86S-7) or NHM 91. The semi-auto versions have also been sold with standard Type 56 stocks instead of the RPD "club foot" style as well as thumbhole variants after 1989. A rare version known as the "National Match" was once sold with a milled receiver and scope and scope mount.
 Type 84 – An export version of the Type 56 rifle chambered for the 5.56×45mm NATO round. Also has underfolder (Type 84-1) and sidefolder (Type 84-2) versions. Civilian semi-auto version known as Type 84S and AKS-223. Special matte black synthetic versions were also available as the Type 84-3, Type 84-4 (underfolder) and Type 84-5 (sidefolder).
 Type 86S – Semi automatic bullpup version.
 KL-7.62 – An Iranian copy of the Type 56. The original version of the KL-7.62 was indistinguishable from the Type 56, but in recent years DIO appears to have made some improvements to the Type 56 design, adding a plastic stock and handguards (rather than wood) and a ribbed receiver cover (featured on most AKM variants, but missing from the Type 56), as well as picatinny rails on newer versions.
 MAZ – Sudanese licensed copy of the Type 56 made by Military Industry Corporation.
 ASh78 (Automatiku Shqiptar 78) – Albanian licensed copy of the Type 56.
 TUL-1 - North Vietnamese-made variant, but with stock of an RPK, barrel sights from an RPD. The TUL-1's body was thin, only 1 mm compared to the 1.5 mm of an RPK. It was also heavier and had an inferior rate of fire compared to the RPK. However, the firing rate and effective range of the weapon was better than an AK-47-based rifle. The TUL-1s were manufactured between 1970–1974 and ended after Vietnam obtained production rights to the RPK itself. They're known to use 30-round magazines from AK-47-based rifles with the occasional 40-round magazine.

Other Type 56 weapons
The "Type 56" designation was also used for Chinese versions of the SKS and of the RPD, known as the Type 56 carbine and Type 56 light machine gun respectively. However, unlike the popular Type 56 rifle, all Type 56 carbines have been removed from military service, except a few used for ceremonial purposes and by local Chinese militia.

Users

 
  Locally produced under small modification of the Albanian Army needs. Main armament of the army until recently when it's being replaced with ARX-160, and M4A1.

 
 
  Boko Haram : Type 56 and Type 56-1
 
 
Used by special forces. Limited numbers seized from criminals and issued to the Civil Police of Rio de Janeiro
 : Burundian rebels.
 
 
 
 
 
  
 : Used by Croatia in its war of independence.
 
 
 
 
 : Purchased in the 1990's and used by Finnish Army reserve personnel. Now in long-term storage.
 
 : Uses thousands of captured Type 56s for Indian police/military/paramilitary forces.

 
 
 
 
 
 
  Libyan National Army: Type 56-1
 
 
 
 : Used by the Nepalese Army and formerly by the People's Liberation Army rebels
 : Contras.
   
 
 
 
 
 
  
 : South Sudan Liberation Movement, South Sudan Democratic Movement, Sudan People's Liberation Army and Lou Nuer militias.
 
 
 
 
  
 
 Lord Resistance Army
   Captured rifles issued to MACVSOG
 
 : Captured from Viet Cong and North Vietnamese Army during the Vietnam War.
 : supplied by Iran to Houthi rebels.

See also
Type 63 assault rifle
Type 81 assault rifle
Type 88 assault rifle
Type 58/68 assault rifle, North Korean versions of the AK/AKM.

References

External links 

Sino Defence

Cold War weapons of China
Rifles of the Cold War
Infantry weapons of the Cold War
7.62×39mm assault rifles
Kalashnikov derivatives
China–Soviet Union relations
Assault rifles of the People's Republic of China
Military equipment introduced in the 1950s
Norinco